Maupihaa, also known as Mopelia, is an atoll in the Leeward group (Iles sous le Vent) of the Society Islands. This atoll is located 72 km southeast of Manuae, its nearest neighbor.

Geography
Maupihaa atoll is roughly 8 km in length and contains a lagoon that is up to 40 m in depth and is surrounded by submerged reefs on three sides. 
The atoll's outer reefs are continuous except for a small passage on the western side of the atoll.  The eastern side consists of a narrow, thickly vegetated, islet (Motu Maupihaa) and a number of smaller islets bring the total land area of Maupihaa to 2.6 km2. The only village on the atoll is located on Motu Maupihaa and as of 1985, the population consisted of just 10 people.

History
Maupihaa Atoll was inhabited in very ancient times by Polynesians; archaeological remains and fish hooks have been found. The first European to arrive on Maupihaa, along with neighboring Fenua Ura and Motu One, was Samuel Wallis in 1767. 

In 1917, the atoll was leased to a Papeete company, with three employees producing copra, and raising pigs and chickens and collecting turtles. It was later leased to another copra company and entirely planted with coconut palms.

In the same year, Count Felix von Luckner of the famed SMS Seeadler visited the island during his voyage to raid Allied shipping in the South Pacific during the First World War. The purpose of the stop was to obtain provisions and to make repairs to the Seeadler's hull after traveling across the Pacific and around South America. After a short time, rough seas and wind caused the Seeadler to run aground on Mopelia's reef, leaving von Luckner and more than 100 others.

At that time only three Polynesians lived on the island, who collected coconuts for Tahiti and processed them into copra. The 64 crew members of the Seeadler and 47 prisoners - crews and passengers of the previously captured ships - lived with the Polynesians on Maupihaa for several months in what Luckner jokingly referred to as "Germany's last colony". The crew built the Seeadlerburg settlement from the remains of the stranded ship.

Some of the stranded sailors were American prisoners of war who were captured on the ocean by Luckner's raiders. However, the plan did not work very well, for while von Luckner was able to reach his destination, he ended up surrendering to a British lieutenant. Von Luckner spent the rest of World War I as a POW in New Zealand, though he successfully escaped on one occasion, absconding on the boat of the prison warden with several other prisoners, only to be recaptured later.

Meanwhile, the rest of his crew captured a French schooner, Lutece, which called at Mopelia, and sailed it to Easter Island arriving on 4 October and running aground there, after which they were interned by the Chilean authorities. Four American seamen then sailed an open boat  to Pago Pago, where they arranged for their colleagues' rescue from Mopelia.

Administration
The atoll is administratively part of the commune (municipality) of Maupiti, itself in the administrative subdivision of the Leeward Islands. Presently Maupihaa is listed as permanently uninhabited.

Alternate names 
 Mopelia
 Maupelia
 Mopihaa
 Maupihoa
 Mapetia

See also

 Desert island
 List of islands

References

External links
Atoll list (in French)

Atolls of the Society Islands
Uninhabited islands of French Polynesia